The Tony Jannus Award recognizes outstanding individual achievement in scheduled commercial aviation by airline executives, inventors and manufacturers, and government leaders. The award is conferred annually by the Tony Jannus Distinguished Aviation Society and was first bestowed in 1964 in Tampa, Florida, U.S. Its namesake, aviation pioneer Tony Jannus (1889–October 12, 1916), piloted the inaugural flight of the St. Petersburg–Tampa Airboat Line on January 1, 1914, the first scheduled commercial airline flight in the world using heavier-than-air aircraft. In addition to preserving the legacy of Tony Jannus, the non-profit Society also offers financial assistance to college students pursuing studies in aviation and conducts an annual essay contest for high school students to encourage careers in aviation.

Past recipients of the award include such famed luminaries as  Eddie Rickenbacker, Donald Douglas, Jimmy Doolittle, C. R. Smith (the founder of American Airlines), William A. Patterson (president of United Airlines 1934–1966), and Chuck Yeager. Those so honored are enshrined at the St. Petersburg Museum of History's First Airline Pavilion. On January 29, 2011, the American Institute of Aeronautics and Astronautics dedicated an historic site plaque on the museum's grounds, commemorating the site of the world’s first regularly scheduled airline.

History

Tony Jannus was an early American pilot whose aerial exploits were widely publicized in aviation's pre-World War I period. He flew the first airplane from which a parachute jump was made, in 1912. Jannus was also the first airline pilot, having pioneered the inaugural flight of the St. Petersburg–Tampa Airboat Line on January 1, 1914, the first scheduled commercial airline flight in the world using heavier-than-air aircraft. Departing from a location near the downtown St. Petersburg Municipal Pier on Second Avenue North, Jannus piloted the twenty-three-minute inaugural flight of the pioneer airline's Benoist XIV flying boat biplane. A crowd of 3,000 gathered at the pier to watch the history-making takeoff at 10 a.m. and were told by organizer Percival Fansler that "What was impossible yesterday is an accomplishment today, while tomorrow heralds the unbelieveable" .  

Occurring just ten years after Wilbur and Orville Wright's historic first airplane flight, the new St. Petersburg–Tampa Airboat Line began providing two daily round trips across Tampa Bay, departing St. Petersburg at 10 a.m. and 2 p.m., with return flights from Tampa departing at 11 a.m. and 3 p.m. At a fare of five dollars, it was the first time tickets were sold to the general public for point-to-point commercial air travel on a scheduled basis.

Fifty years later, in 1963, James Hamlett and the Greater Tampa Chamber of Commerce created the Tony Jannus Award to recognize the "Man who has done the most to advance the airline industry" and to celebrate the Tampa Bay area's historic role in the development of commercial aviation. The following March 1964, Senator A. S. Mike Monroney was named the first Tony Jannus Award recipient for his work as chairman of the U.S. Senate's Aviation Subcommittee and as chief proponent of the Federal Aviation Act of 1958 that created the Federal Aviation Administration. In the 1970s, the St. Petersburg Chamber of Commerce joined with the Tampa chamber to co-sponsor the award. The joint effort by the two chambers of commerce eventually evolved into the Tony Jannus Distinguished Aviation Society, a non-profit organization which now confers the award.

Recipients of the Tony Jannus Award
 
Winners of the Tony Jannus Award are enshrined at the St. Petersburg Museum of History's First Airline Pavilion and Tony Jannus-related exhibits. The replica was built by the Florida Aviation Historical Society in 1983 and flown across Tampa Bay from St. Petersburg to Tampa on January 1, 1984, in a reenactment of the Jannus inaugural flight 70 years earlier. The replica was moved to the museum in January, 1993.

A permanent exhibit at Tampa International Airport also pays tribute to the following individuals (by year) who have received the Tony Jannus Award since 1964:
 1964: A. S. Mike Monroney — U.S. Senator, Oklahoma
 1965: Juan Trippe — founder, Pan American Airways
 1966: Donald Wills Douglas, Sr. — founder, Douglas Aircraft Company
 1967: Eddie Rickenbacker — chairman, Eastern Air Lines and Medal of Honor recipient and World War I aviator
 1968: William A. Patterson — president of United Airlines (1934–1966)
 1969: Frank Whittle — jet engine developer
 1970: Daniel J. Haughton – chairman, Lockheed Aircraft
 1971: William M. Allen — chairman, Boeing
 1972: Jimmy Doolittle — instrument flight developer and Medal of Honor World War II aviator
 1973: Geoffrey Knight and Henri Ziegler — Concorde co-developers
 1974: Bill Lear — aircraft radios and avionics developer
 1975: Elrey Borge Jeppesen — founder and chairman, Jeppesen
 1976: C. R. Smith – founder, American Airlines
 1977: Robert F. Six — founder, Continental Airlines
 1978: Donald Nyrop – chairman, Northwest Airlines
 1979: Jehangir Tata — founder, Air India
 1980: Thomas Davis – founder, Piedmont Airlines
 1981: Howard W. Cannon — U.S. Senator, Nevada
 1982: Manuel Sosa de la Vega – president, Mexicana de Aviación
 1983: David C. Garrett, Jr. — president, Delta Air Lines
 1984: Knut Hammarskjold – director general, International Air Transport AssociationWayne Parrish – aviation publisher
 1985: Edward Curtis Wells — aircraft designer, Boeing
 1986: Frank Borman — chairman, Eastern Air Lines and astronaut
 1987: Jerome F. Lederer — founder, Flight Safety Foundation
 1989: Sir Lenox Hewitt – chairman, Qantas
 1990: Edwin Colodny – chairman, US Airways
 1991: Colin Marshall — CEO, British Airways
 1992: Thornton A. Wilson — chairman, Boeing
 1993: Herbert D. Kelleher — CEO, Southwest Airlines
 1994: Alan S. Boyd — U.S. Secretary of Transportation
 1995: Martin Schröder – founder, Martinair
 1996: J. George Mikelsons — founder, ATA Airlines
 1997: Chuck Yeager — supersonic flight pioneer
 1998: Angus Kinnear – president, Canada 3000
 1999: Federico Bloch – CEO, Grupo TACA
 2000: Richard Branson — chairman, Virgin Atlantic
 2001: Robert Crandall — CEO, American Airlines
 2002: Freddie Laker — founder, Laker Airways
 2003: Gordon Bethune — CEO, Continental Airlines
 2004: Norman Mineta — U.S. Secretary of Transportation
 2005: David Neeleman — CEO, JetBlue Airways
 2006: Joe Leonard – CEO, AirTran Airways
 2007: Colleen Barrett — president, Southwest Airlines
 2008: Larry Kellner — CEO, Continental Airlines
 2009: James L. Oberstar — U.S. Congressman
 2010: Jaan Albrecht – CEO, Star Alliance since 2001
2011: Frederick W. Smith — Founder and CEO, FedEx
2012: Frederico Curado – CEO, Embraer
2013: Richard H. Anderson — CEO, Delta Air Lines
2014: Pedro Heilbron— CEO, Copa Airlines
2015: Maurice J. Gallagher, Jr., CEO, Allegiant Air
2016: Gary C. Kelly, CEO, Southwest Airlines
2017: Doug Parker, CEO, American Airlines
2018: Chesley Sullenberger, airline safety advocate and "Miracle on the Hudson" US Airways pilot
2019: Tom Enders, CEO, Airbus

Tony Jannus Distinguished Aviation Society

The Society is a 501(c)(3) non-profit organization based in Tampa, Florida, and governed by a board of directors composed of distinguished industry leaders and Tampa Bay area officials. Financial support is provided by prominent companies and organizations related to the aviation industry. The stated threefold mission of the Society is to:
 Promote the recognition and understanding that the first scheduled commercial passenger airline operated between St. Petersburg and Tampa, Florida.
 Provide scholarships and financial aid for college level education in the field of commercial aviation or related fields.
 Encourage the interest and participation of high school students in commercial aviation.

The Society holds its annual luncheon and dinner banquet in the Tampa Bay area, when the Tony Jannus Award is conferred for that year, in the presence of past recipients. These meetings are also the occasion for recognizing those college students selected to receive the Society's financial assistance, along with high school students excelling in the Essay Contest.

See also

 List of aviation awards

References

External links
 Tony Jannus Distinguished Aviation Society – official website
 St. Petersburg Museum of History

Aviation awards
Awards established in 1964
1964 establishments in Florida